Marxdorf may refer to:

Places
Germany
 Marxdorf (Uebigau-Wahrenbrück), a village of Uebigau-Wahrenbrück municipality, Elbe-Elster, Brandenburg
 Marxdorf (Vierlinden), a village of Vierlinden municipality, Märkisch-Oderland, Brandenburg
 Marxdorf (Schashagen), a village of Schashagen municipality, Ostholstein, Schleswig-Holstein

Poland
 Garncarsko (German: Marxdorf), a village of Sobótka municipality, Wrocław County, Lower Silesian Voivodeship

Other
 Marxdorfer Wolfshund, a German Wolf-dog hybrids named after Marxdorf (Uebigau-Wahrenbrück)

See also
 Maxdorf, a German municipality in the Rhein-Pfalz-Kreis, Rhineland-Palatinate
 Maxdorf (Verbandsgemeinde), a German collective municipality in the Rhein-Pfalz-Kreis, Rhineland-Palatinate